Sir Ian Murray McKellen  (born 25 May 1939) is an English actor. With a career spanning over six decades, he is noted for his performances on the screen and stage in genres ranging from Shakespearean dramas and modern theatre to popular fantasy and science fiction. Regarded as a British cultural icon,  he has received various accolades, including a Tony Award, a Golden Globe Award and six Laurence Olivier Awards, in addition to nominations for two Academy Awards, five BAFTA Awards and five Primetime Emmy Awards.

McKellen began his professional career in 1961 at the Belgrade Theatre as a member of their highly regarded repertory company. In 1965, McKellen made his first West End appearance. In 1969, he was invited to join the Prospect Theatre Company to play the lead parts in Shakespeare's Richard II and Marlowe's Edward II, and he firmly established himself as one of the country's foremost classical actors. In the 1970s, McKellen became a stalwart of the Royal Shakespeare Company and the National Theatre of Great Britain. In 1981 he received his first Tony Award nomination and win for Best Actor in a Play for his role as Antonio Salieri in Amadeus. 

McKellen achieved worldwide fame for his film roles, including the titular King in Richard III (1995), James Whale in Gods and Monsters (1998), Magneto in the X-Men films, and Gandalf in The Lord of the Rings and The Hobbit trilogies. BBC stated how his "performances have guaranteed him a place in the canon of English stage and film actors".

McKellen was knighted in 1991 for services to the performing arts, and made a Companion of Honour for services to drama and to equality in the 2008 New Year Honours. He came out as gay in 1988, and has since championed LGBT social movements worldwide. He was awarded the Freedom of the City of London in October 2014.

Early life and education 
McKellen was born on 25 May 1939 in Burnley, Lancashire, the son of Margery Lois (née Sutcliffe) and Denis Murray McKellen. He was their second child, with a sister, Jean, five years his senior. Shortly before the outbreak of the Second World War in September 1939, his family moved to Wigan. They lived there until Ian was twelve years old, before relocating to Bolton in 1951 after his father had been promoted. The experience of living through the war as a young child had a lasting impact on him, and he later said that "only after peace resumed ... did I realise that war wasn't normal". When an interviewer remarked that he seemed quite calm in the aftermath of the 11 September attacks, McKellen said: "Well, darling, you forget—I slept under a steel plate until I was four years old".

McKellen's father was a civil engineer and lay preacher, and was of Protestant Irish and Scottish descent. Both of McKellen's grandfathers were preachers, and his great-great-grandfather, James McKellen, was a "strict, evangelical Protestant minister" in Ballymena, County Antrim. His home environment was strongly Christian, but non-orthodox. "My upbringing was of low nonconformist Christians who felt that you led the Christian life in part by behaving in a Christian manner to everybody you met". When he was 12, his mother died of breast cancer; his father died when he was 25. After his coming out as gay to his stepmother, Gladys McKellen, who was a Quaker, he said, "Not only was she not fazed, but as a member of a society which declared its indifference to people's sexuality years back, I think she was just glad for my sake that I wasn't lying any more". His great-great-grandfather Robert J. Lowes was an activist and campaigner in the ultimately successful campaign for a Saturday half-holiday in Manchester, the forerunner to the modern five-day work week, thus making Lowes a "grandfather of the modern weekend".

McKellen attended Bolton School (Boys' Division), of which he is still a supporter, attending regularly to talk to pupils. McKellen's acting career started at Bolton Little Theatre, of which he is now the patron. An early fascination with the theatre was encouraged by his parents, who took him on a family outing to Peter Pan at the Opera House in Manchester when he was three. When he was nine, his main Christmas present was a fold-away wood and bakelite Victorian theatre from Pollocks Toy Theatres, with cardboard scenery and wires to push on the cut-outs of Cinderella and of Laurence Olivier's reenactment of Shakespeare's "Hamlet".

His sister took him to his first Shakespeare play, Twelfth Night, by the amateurs of Wigan's Little Theatre, shortly followed by their Macbeth and Wigan High School for Girls' production of A Midsummer Night's Dream, with music by Mendelssohn, with the role of Bottom played by Jean McKellen, who continued to act, direct, and produce amateur theatre until her death.

In 1958, McKellen, at the age of 18, won a scholarship to St Catharine's College, Cambridge, where he read English literature. He has since been made an Honorary Fellow of the college. While at Cambridge, McKellen was a member of the Marlowe Society, where he appeared in 23 plays over the course of 3 years. At that young age he was already giving performances that have since become legendary such as his Justice Shallow in Henry IV alongside Trevor Nunn and Derek Jacobi (March 1959), Cymbeline (as Posthumus, opposite Margaret Drabble as Imogen) and Doctor Faustus. During this period McKellen had already been directed by Peter Hall, John Barton and Dadie Rylands, all of whom would have a significant impact on McKellen's future career.

Career

Theatre

1965–1969: Theatre debut and early roles 

McKellen made his first professional appearance in 1961 at the Belgrade Theatre in Coventry, as Roper in A Man for All Seasons, although an audio recording of the Marlowe Society's Cymbeline had gone on commercial sale as part of the Argo Shakespeare series.

After four years in regional repertory theatres, McKellen made his first West End appearance, in A Scent of Flowers, regarded as a "notable success". In 1965 he was a member of Laurence Olivier's National Theatre Company at the Old Vic, which led to roles at the Chichester Festival. With the Prospect Theatre Company, McKellen made his breakthrough performances of Shakespeare's Richard II (directed by Richard Cottrell) and Christopher Marlowe's Edward II (directed by Toby Robertson) at the Edinburgh Festival in 1969, the latter causing a storm of protest over the enactment of the homosexual Edward's lurid death.

1970–1985: National Theatre roles and Broadway debut 
In the 1970s, McKellen became a well-known figure in British theatre, performing frequently at the Royal Shakespeare Company and the Royal National Theatre, where he played several leading Shakespearean roles. From 1973 to 1974, McKellen toured the United Kingdom and Brooklyn Academy of Music portraying Lady Wishfort's Footman, Kruschov, and Edgar in the William Congreve comedy The Way of the World, Anton Chekov's comedic three-act play The Wood Demon and William Shakespeare tragedy King Lear. The following year, he starred in Shakespeare's King John, George Colman's The Clandestine Marriage, and George Bernard Shaw's Too True to Be Good. From 1976 to 1977 he portrayed Romeo in the Shakespeare romance Romeo & Juliet at the Royal Shakespeare Theatre. The following year he played King Leontes in The Winter's Tale.

In 1976, McKellen played the title role in William Shakespeare's Macbeth (which he had first played for Trevor Nunn in a "gripping ... out of the ordinary" production, with Judi Dench, at Stratford in 1976 and Iago in Othello, in award-winning productions directed by Nunn. Both of these productions were adapted into television films, also directed by Nunn. From 1978 to 1979 he toured in a double feature production of Shakespeare's Twelfth Night, and Anton Chekov's Three Sisters portraying Sir Toby Belch and Andrei, respectively.

In 1979, McKellen gained acclaim for his role as Antonio Salieri in the Broadway transfer production of Peter Shaffer's play Amadeus. It was an immensely popular play produced by the National Theatre originally starring Paul Scofield. The transfer starred McKellen, Tim Curry as Wolfgang Amadeus Mozart, and Jane Seymour as Constanze Mozart. The New York Times theatre critic Frank Rich wrote of McKellen's performance "In Mr. McKellen's superb performance, Salieri's descent into madness was portrayed in dark notes of almost bone-rattling terror". For his performance, McKellen received the Tony Award for Best Actor in a Play.

1986–2001: Roles on Broadway and the West End 
In 1986, he returned to Broadway in the revival of Anton Chekhov's first play Wild Honey alongside Kim Cattrall and Kate Burton. The play concerned a local Russian schoolteacher who struggles to remain faithful to his wife, despite the attention of three other women. McKellen received mixed reviews from critics in particular Frank Rich of The New York Times who praised him for his "bravura and athletically graceful technique that provides everything except, perhaps, the thing that matters most—sustained laughter". He later wrote, "Mr. McKellen finds himself in the peculiar predicament of the star who strains to carry a frail supporting cast". In 1989 he played Iago in production of Othello by the Royal Shakespeare Company.

From 1990 to 1992, he acted in a world tour of a lauded revival of Richard III, playing the title character. The production played at the Brooklyn Academy of Music for two weeks before continuing its tour where Frank Rich of New York Times was able to review it. In his piece, he praised McKellen's performance writing, "Mr McKellen's highly sophisticated sense of theatre and fun drives him to reveal the secrets of how he pulls his victims' strings whether he is addressing the audience in a soliloquy or not". For his performance he received the Laurence Olivier Award for Best Actor.

In 1992, he acted in Pam Gems's revival of Chekov's Uncle Vanya at the Royal National Theatre alongside Antony Sher, and Janet McTeer. From 1993 to 1997 McKellen toured in a one-man show entitled, A Knights Out, about coming out as a gay man. Laurie Winer from The Los Angeles Times wrote, "Even if he is preaching to the converted, McKellen makes us aware of the vast and powerful intolerance outside the comfortable walls of the theatre. Endowed with a rare technique, he is a natural storyteller, an admirable human being and a hands-on activist". From 1997 to 1998, he starred as Dr. Tomas Stockmann in a revival of Henrik Ibsen's An Enemy of the People. Later that year he played Garry Essendine in the Noël Coward comedy Present Laughter at the West Yorkshire Playhouse.

McKellen returned to the Broadway stage in 2001 in a August Strindberg play The Dance of Death alongside Helen Mirren, and David Strathairn at the Broadhurst Theatre. The New York Times Theatre critic Ben Brantley praised McKellen's performance writing, "[McKellen] returns to Broadway to serve up an Elysian concoction we get to sample too little these days: a mixture of heroic stage presence, actorly intelligence, and rarefied theatrical technique". McKellen toured with the production at the Lyric Theatre in London's West End and to the Sydney Art's Festival in Australia.

2007–2021: Return to the theatre 

In 2007, he returned to the Royal Shakespeare Company, in productions of King Lear and The Seagull, both directed by Trevor Nunn. In 2009, he appeared in a very popular revival of Waiting for Godot at London's Haymarket Theatre, directed by Sean Mathias, and playing opposite Patrick Stewart. From 2013 to 2014, McKellen and Stewart starred in a double production of Samuel Beckett's Waiting for Godot and Harold Pinter's No Man's Land on Broadway at the Cort Theatre. Variety theatre critic Marilyn Stasio praised the dual production writing, "McKellen and Stewart find plenty of consoling comedy in two masterpieces of existential despair". In both productions of Stasio claims, "the two thespians play the parts they were meant to play".

He is Patron of English Touring Theatre and also President and Patron of the Little Theatre Guild of Great Britain, an association of amateur theatre organisations throughout the UK. In late August 2012, he took part in the opening ceremony of the London Paralympics, portraying Prospero from The Tempest.

In October 2017, McKellen played King Lear at the Chichester Festival Theatre, a role which he said was likely to be his "last big Shakespearean part". He performed the play at the Duke of York's Theatre in London's West End during the summer of 2018. To celebrate his 80th birthday, in 2019 McKellen performed in a one-man stage show titled Ian McKellen on Stage: With Tolkien, Shakespeare, Others and YOU celebrating the various performances throughout his career. The show toured across the UK and Ireland (raising money for each venue and organisation's charity) before a West End run at the Harold Pinter Theatre and was performed for one night only on Broadway at the Hudson Theatre.

In 2021, he played the title role in an age-blind production of Hamlet (having previously played the part in a UK and European tour in 1971), followed by the role of Firs in Chekov's The Cherry Orchard at the Theatre Royal, Windsor.

Film

1969–1989: Film debut and character actor 
In 1969, McKellen starred in three films, Michael Hayes's The Promise, Clive Donner's epic film Alfred the Great, and Waris Hussein's A Touch of Love. In 1981, McKellen portrayed writer and poet D. H. Lawrence in the Christopher Miles directed biographical film, Priest of Love. He followed up with Michael Mann's horror film The Keep (1983).

In 1985, he starred in Plenty, the film adaptation of the David Hare play of the same name. The film was directed by Fred Schepisi and starred Meryl Streep, Charles Dance, John Gielgud, and Sting. The film spans nearly 20 years from the early 1940s to the 1960s, around an Englishwoman's experiences as a fighter for the French Resistance during World War II when she has a one-night stand with a British intelligence agent. The film received mixed reviews with Roger Ebert of The Chicago Sun-Times praising the film's ensemble cast writing, "The performances in the movie supply one brilliant solo after another; most of the big moments come as characters dominate the scenes they are in".

McKellen starred in the British drama Scandal a fictionalised account of the Profumo affair that rocked the government of British prime minister Harold Macmillan. McKellen portrayed John Profumo. The film starred Joanne Whalley, and John Hurt. The film premiered at the 1989 Cannes Film Festival and competed for the Palme d'Or.

1990–1998: Richard III and critical acclaim 
In 1993, he starred in the film Six Degrees of Separation based on the Pulitzer Prize and Tony Award nominated play of the same name. McKellen starred alongside Will Smith, Donald Sutherland and Stockard Channing. The film was a critical success. That same year, he also appeared in the western The Ballad of Little Jo opposite Bob Hoskins and the action comedy Last Action Hero starring Arnold Schwarzenegger. The following year, he appeared in the superhero film The Shadow with Alec Baldwin and the James L. Brooks directed comedy I'll Do Anything starring Nick Nolte.

In 1995, McKellen made his screenwriting debut with Richard III, an ambitious adaptation of William Shakespeare's play of the same name, directed by Richard Loncraine. The film reimagines the play's story and characters to a setting based on 1930s Britain, with Richard depicted as a fascist plotting to usurp the throne. McKellen stars in the title role alongside an ensemble cast including Annette Bening, Robert Downey Jr., Jim Broadbent, Kristen Scott Thomas, Nigel Hawthorne and Dame Maggie Smith. As executive producer he returned his £50,000 fee to complete the filming of the final battle. In his review of the film, The Washington Post film critic Hal Hinson called McKellen's performance a "lethally flamboyant incarnation" and said his "florid mastery ... dominates everything". Film critic Roger Ebert of the Chicago Sun-Times praised McKellen's adaptation and his performance in his four star review writing, "McKellen has a deep sympathy for the playwright ... Here he brings to Shakespeare's most tortured villain a malevolence we are moved to pity. No man should be so evil, and know it. Hitler and others were more evil, but denied out to themselves. There is no escape for Richard. He is one of the first self-aware characters in the theatre, and for that distinction he must pay the price". His performance in the title role garnered BAFTA and Golden Globe nominations for Best Actor and won the European Film Award for Best Actor. His screenplay was nominated for the BAFTA Award for Best Adapted Screenplay. That same year, he appeared in the historical drama Restoration (1995) also starring Downey Jr., as well as Meg Ryan, Hugh Grant, and David Thewlis. He also appeared in the British romantic comedy Jack and Sarah (1995) starring Richard E. Grant, Samantha Mathis, and Dame Judi Dench.

In 1998, he appeared in the modestly acclaimed psychological thriller Apt Pupil, which was directed by Bryan Singer and based on a story by Stephen King. McKellen portrayed a fugitive Nazi officer living under a false name in the US who is befriended by a curious teenager (Brad Renfro) who threatens to expose him unless he tells his story in detail. That same year, he played James Whale, the director of Frankenstein in the Bill Condon directed period drama Gods and Monsters, a role for which he was subsequently nominated for the Academy Award for Best Actor, losing it to Roberto Benigni in Life is Beautiful (1998).

2000–2007: The Lord of the Rings and X-Men 

In 1999, McKellen was cast, again under the direction of Bryan Singer, to play the comic book supervillain Magneto in the 2000 film X-Men and its sequels X2: X-Men United (2003) and X-Men: The Last Stand (2006). He later reprised his role of Magneto in 2014's X-Men: Days of Future Past, sharing the role with Michael Fassbender, who played a younger version of the character in 2011's X-Men: First Class.

While filming the first X-Men film in 1999, McKellen was cast as the wizard Gandalf in Peter Jackson's film trilogy adaptation of The Lord of the Rings (consisting of The Fellowship of the Ring, The Two Towers, and The Return of the King), released between 2001 and 2003. He received honours from the Screen Actors Guild for Best Supporting Actor in a Motion Picture for his work in The Fellowship of the Ring and was nominated for the Academy Award for Best Supporting Actor for the same role. He provided the voice of Gandalf for several video game adaptations of the Lord of the Rings films.

McKellen has appeared in limited release films, such as Emile (which was shot in three weeks following the X2 shoot), Neverwas and Asylum. In 2006, He appeared as Sir Leigh Teabing in The Da Vinci Code opposite Tom Hanks as Robert Langdon. During a 17 May 2006 interview on The Today Show with the Da Vinci Code cast and director Ron Howard, Matt Lauer posed a question to the group about how they would have felt if the film had borne a prominent disclaimer that it is a work of fiction, as some religious groups wanted. McKellen responded, "I've often thought the Bible should have a disclaimer in the front saying 'This is fiction'. I mean, walking on water? It takes ... an act of faith. And I have faith in this movie—not that it's true, not that it's factual, but that it's a jolly good story". He continued, "And I think audiences are clever enough and bright enough to separate out fact and fiction, and discuss the thing when they've seen it".

In 2007, McKellen narrated the romantic fantasy adventure film Stardust starring Charlie Cox and Claire Danes, which was a critical and financial success. That same year, he lent his voice to the armored bear Iorek Byrnison in the Chris Weitz-directed fantasy film The Golden Compass based on the acclaimed Philip Pullman novel Northern Lights and starred Nicole Kidman and Daniel Craig. The film received mixed reviews but was a financial success.

2012–2019: The Hobbit, X-Men and other roles 

McKellen reprised the role of Gandalf on screen in Peter Jackson's three-part film adaptation of The Hobbit starting with The Hobbit: An Unexpected Journey (2012), followed by The Hobbit: The Desolation of Smaug (2013), and finally The Hobbit: The Battle of the Five Armies (2014). Despite the series receiving mixed reviews, it emerged as a financial success. McKellen also reprised his role as Erik Lehnsherr/Magneto in James Mangold's The Wolverine (2013), and Singer's X-Men: Days of Future Past (2014).

In 2015, McKellen reunited with director Bill Condon playing an elderly Sherlock Holmes in the mystery film Mr. Holmes alongside Laura Linney. In the film based on the novel A Slight Trick of the Mind (2005), Holmes now 93, struggles to recall the details of his final case because his mind is slowly deteriorating. The film premiered at the 65th Berlin International Film Festival with McKellen receiving acclaim for his performance. Rolling Stone film critic Peter Travers praised his performance writing, "Don't think you can take another Hollywood version of Sherlock Holmes? Snap out of it. Apologies to Robert Downey Jr. and Benedict Cumberbatch, but what Ian McKellen does with Arthur Conan Doyle's fictional detective in Mr Holmes is nothing short of magnificent ... Director Bill Condon, who teamed superbly with McKellen on the Oscar-winning Gods and Monsters, brings us a riveting character study of a lion not going gentle into winter".

In 2017, McKellen portrayed in a supporting role as Cogsworth (originally voiced by David Ogden Stiers in the 1991 animated film) in the live-action adaptation of Disney's Beauty and the Beast, directed by Bill Condon (which marked the third collaboration between Condon and McKellen, after Gods and Monsters and Mr. Holmes) and co-starred alongside Emma Watson and Dan Stevens. The film was released to positive reviews and grossed $1.2billion worldwide, making it the highest-grossing live-action musical film, the second highest-grossing film of 2017, and the 17th highest-grossing film of all time. The following year, he appeared in Kenneth Branagh's historical drama All is True (2018) portraying Henry Wriothesley, 3rd Earl of Southampton, opposite Branagh and Judi Dench.

In 2019, he reunited with Condon for a fourth time in the mystery thriller The Good Liar opposite Helen Mirren, who received praise for their onscreen chemistry. That same year, he appeared as Gus the Theatre Cat in the movie musical adaptation of Cats directed by Tom Hooper. The film featured performances from Jennifer Hudson, James Corden, Rebel Wilson, Idris Elba, and Judi Dench. The film was widely panned for its poor visual effects, editing, performances, screenplay, and was a box office disaster.

Television

1966–1981: Television debut and early roles 
One of McKellen's first major roles on television was as the title character in the BBC's 1966 adaptation of David Copperfield, which achieved 12 million viewers on its initial airings. After some rebroadcasting in the late 60s, the master videotapes for the serial were wiped, and only four scattered episodes (3, 8, 9 and 11) survive as telerecordings, three of which feature McKellen as adult David. McKellen had taken film roles throughout his career—beginning in 1969 with his role of George Matthews in A Touch of Love, and his first leading role was in 1980 as D. H. Lawrence in Priest of Love, but it was not until the 1990s that he became more widely recognised in this medium after several roles in blockbuster Hollywood films.

1990–1999: HBO Projects and awards success 
In 1993, he appeared in minor roles in the television miniseries Tales of the City, based on the novel by his friend Armistead Maupin. Later that year, McKellen appeared in the HBO television film And the Band Played On based on the acclaimed novel of the same name about the discovery of HIV. For his performance as gay rights activist Bill Kraus, McKellen received the CableACE Award for Supporting Actor in a Movie or Miniseries and was nominated for the Primetime Emmy Award for Outstanding Supporting Actor in a Miniseries or a Movie.

In 1995, he appeared in the BBC television comedy film Cold Comfort Farm starring Kate Beckinsale, Rufus Sewell, and Stephen Fry. The following year he starred as Tsar Nicholas II in the HBO made-for-television movie Rasputin: Dark Servant of Destiny (1996) starring Alan Rickman as Rasputin. For his performance, McKellen earned a Primetime Emmy Award for Outstanding Supporting Actor in a Limited Series or Movie nomination and received a Golden Globe Award for Best Supporting Actor – Series, Miniseries or Television Film win.

McKellen appeared as Mr Creakle in the BBC series David Copperfield based on the Charles Dickens classic novel. The miniseries starred a pre-Harry Potter Daniel Radcliffe, Bob Hoskins, and Dame Maggie Smith.

2003–2017: Dramas, guest roles and sitcom 
On 16 March 2002, he hosted Saturday Night Live. In 2003, McKellen made a guest appearance as himself on the American cartoon show The Simpsons in a special British-themed episode entitled "The Regina Monologues", along with the then UK Prime Minister Tony Blair and author J. K. Rowling. In April and May 2005, he played the role of Mel Hutchwright in Granada Television's long-running British soap opera, Coronation Street, fulfilling a lifelong ambition. He narrated Richard Bell's film Eighteen as a grandfather who leaves his World War II memoirs on audio-cassette for his teenage grandson.

McKellen appeared in the 2006 BBC series of Ricky Gervais's comedy series Extras, where he played himself directing Gervais's character Andy Millman in a play about gay lovers. McKellen received a 2007 Primetime Emmy Award for Outstanding Guest Actor – Comedy Series nomination for his performance. In 2009 he portrayed Number Two in The Prisoner, a remake of the 1967 cult series The Prisoner. In November 2013, McKellen appeared in the Doctor Who 50th anniversary comedy homage The Five(ish) Doctors Reboot.

From 2013 to 2016, McKellen co-starred in the ITV sitcom Vicious as Freddie Thornhill, alongside Derek Jacobi. The series revolves around an elderly gay couple who have been together for 50 years. The show's original title was "Vicious Old Queens". There are ongoing jokes about McKellen's career as a relatively unsuccessful character actor who owns a tux because he stole it after doing a guest spot on "Downton Abbey" and that he holds the title of "10th Most Popular ‘Doctor Who’ Villain". Liz Shannon Miller of IndieWire noted while the concept seemed, "weird as hell", that "Once you come to accept McKellen and Jacobi in a multi-camera format, there is a lot to respect about their performances; specifically, the way that those decades of classical training adapt themselves to the sitcom world. Much has been written before about how the tradition of the multi-cam, filmed in front of a studio audience, relates to theatre, and McKellen and Jacobi know how to play to a live crowd".

In October 2015, McKellen appeared as Norman to Anthony Hopkins's Sir in a BBC Two production of Ronald Harwood's The Dresser, alongside Edward Fox, Vanessa Kirby, and Emily Watson. Television critic Tim Goodman of The Hollywood Reporter praised the film and the central performances writing, "there’s no escaping that Hopkins and McKellen are the central figures here, giving wonderfully nuanced performances, onscreen together for their first time in their acclaimed careers". For his performance McKellen received a British Academy Television Award nomination for his performance.

In 2017, McKellen appeared in the documentary McKellen: Playing the Part, directed by director Joe Stephenson. The documentary explores McKellen's life and career as an actor.

Personal life
McKellen and his first partner, Brian Taylor, a history teacher from Bolton, began their relationship in 1964. Their relationship lasted for eight years, ending in 1972. They lived in London, where McKellen continued to pursue his career as an actor. In 1978 he met his second partner, Sean Mathias, at the Edinburgh Festival. This relationship lasted until 1988, and according to Mathias, it was tempestuous, with conflicts over McKellen's success in acting versus Mathias's somewhat less-successful career. The two remained friends, with Mathias later directing McKellen in Waiting for Godot at the Theatre Royal Haymarket in 2009. The pair entered into a business partnership with Evgeny Lebedev, purchasing the lease of The Grapes public house in Narrow Street. As of 2005, McKellen had been living in Narrow Street, Limehouse, for more than 25 years, more than a decade of which had been spent in a five-storey Victorian conversion.

McKellen is an atheist. In the late 1980s, he lost his appetite for every kind of meat but fish, and has since followed a mainly pescetarian diet. In 2001, Ian McKellen received the Artist Citizen of the World Award (France).

McKellen has a tattoo of the Elvish number nine, written using J. R. R. Tolkien's constructed script of Tengwar, on his shoulder in reference to his involvement in the Lord of the Rings and the fact that his character was one of the original nine companions of the Fellowship of the Ring. All but one of the other actors of "The Fellowship" (Elijah Wood, Sean Astin, Orlando Bloom, Billy Boyd, Sean Bean, Dominic Monaghan and Viggo Mortensen) have the same tattoo (John Rhys-Davies did not get the tattoo, but his stunt double Brett Beattie did).

McKellen was diagnosed with prostate cancer in 2006. In 2012, he stated on his blog that "There is no cause for alarm. I am examined regularly and the cancer is contained. I've not needed any treatment".

McKellen became an ordained minister of the Universal Life Church in early 2013 in order to preside over the marriage of his friend and X-Men co-star Sir Patrick Stewart to the singer Sunny Ozell.

McKellen was awarded an honorary Doctorate of Letters by Cambridge University on 18 June 2014. He was made a Freeman of the City of London on Thursday 30 October 2014. The ceremony took place at Guildhall in London. He was nominated by London's Lord Mayor Fiona Woolf, who said he was an "exceptional actor" and "tireless campaigner for equality". He is also an Emeritus Fellow of St Catherine's College, Oxford.

Activism

LGBT rights

While McKellen had made his sexual orientation known to fellow actors early on in his stage career, it was not until 1988 that he came out to the general public, in a programme on BBC Radio. The context that prompted McKellen's decision, overriding any concerns about a possible negative effect on his career, was that the controversial Section 28 of the Local Government Bill, known simply as Section 28, was then under consideration in the British Parliament. Section 28 proposed prohibiting local authorities from promoting homosexuality "... as a kind of pretended family relationship". McKellen became active in fighting the proposed law, and, during a BBC Radio 3 programme where he debated Section 28 with the conservative journalist Peregrine Worsthorne, came out as gay. McKellen has stated that he was influenced in his decision by the advice and support of his friends, among them noted gay author Armistead Maupin. In a 1998 interview that discusses the 29th anniversary of the Stonewall riots, McKellen commented, I have many regrets about not having come out earlier, but one of them might be that I didn't engage myself in the politicking. He has said of this period: My own participating in that campaign was a focus for people [to] take comfort that if Ian McKellen was on board for this, perhaps it would be all right for other people to be as well, gay and straight. Section 28 was, however, enacted and remained on the statute books until 2000 in Scotland and 2003 in England and Wales. Section 28 never applied in Northern Ireland.

In 2003, during an appearance on Have I Got News For You, McKellen claimed when he visited Michael Howard, then Environment Secretary (responsible for local government), in 1988 to lobby against Section 28, Howard refused to change his position but did ask him to leave an autograph for his children. McKellen agreed, but wrote, "Fuck off, I'm gay". McKellen described Howard's junior ministers, Conservatives David Wilshire and Jill Knight, who were the architects of Section 28, as the 'ugly sisters' of a political pantomime.

McKellen has continued to be very active in LGBT rights efforts. In a statement on his website regarding his activism, the actor commented:

McKellen is a co-founder of Stonewall, an LGBT rights lobby group in the United Kingdom, named after the Stonewall riots. McKellen is also patron of LGBT History Month, Pride London, Oxford Pride, GAY-GLOS, LGBT Foundation and FFLAG where he appears in their video "Parents Talking".

In 1994, at the closing ceremony of the Gay Games, he briefly took the stage to address the crowd, saying, "I'm Sir Ian McKellen, but you can call me Serena": This nickname, given to him by Stephen Fry, had been circulating within the gay community since McKellen's knighthood was conferred. In 2002, he was the Celebrity Grand Marshal of the San Francisco Pride Parade and he attended the Academy Awards with his then-boyfriend, New Zealander Nick Cuthell. In 2006, McKellen spoke at the pre-launch of the 2007 LGBT History Month in the UK, lending his support to the organisation and its founder, Sue Sanders. In 2007, he became a patron of The Albert Kennedy Trust, an organisation that provides support to young, homeless and troubled LGBT people.

In 2006, he became a patron of Oxford Pride, stating:I send my love to all members of Oxford Pride, their sponsors and supporters, of which I am proud to be one ... Onlookers can be impressed by our confidence and determination to be ourselves and gay people, of whatever age, can be comforted by the occasion to take the first steps towards coming out and leaving the closet forever behind.

McKellen has taken his activism internationally, and caused a major stir in Singapore, where he was invited to do an interview on a morning show and shocked the interviewer by asking if they could recommend him a gay bar; the programme immediately ended. In December 2008, he was named in Out annual Out 100 list.

In 2010, McKellen extended his support for Liverpool's Homotopia festival in which a group of gay and lesbian Merseyside teenagers helped to produce an anti-homophobia campaign pack for schools and youth centres across the city. In May 2011, he called Sergey Sobyanin, Moscow's mayor, a "coward" for refusing to allow gay parades in the city.

In 2014, he was named in the top 10 on the World Pride Power list.

Charity work
In April 2010, along with actors Brian Cox and Eleanor Bron, McKellen appeared in a series of TV advertisements to support Age UK, the charity recently formed from the merger of Age Concern and Help the Aged. All three actors gave their time free of charge.

A cricket fan since childhood, McKellen umpired in March 2011 for a charity cricket match in New Zealand to support earthquake victims of the February 2011 Christchurch earthquake.

McKellen is an honorary board member for the New York- and Washington, D.C.-based organization Only Make Believe. Only Make Believe creates and performs interactive plays in children's hospitals and care facilities. He was honoured by the organisation in 2012 and hosted their annual Make Believe on Broadway Gala in November 2013. He garnered publicity for the organisation by stripping down to his Lord of the Rings underwear on stage.

McKellen also has a history of supporting individual theatres. While in New Zealand filming The Hobbit in 2012, he announced a special New Zealand tour "Shakespeare, Tolkien and You!", with proceeds going to help save the Isaac Theatre Royal, which suffered extensive damage during the 2011 Christchurch earthquake. McKellen said he opted to help save the building as it was the last theatre he played in New Zealand (Waiting for Godot in 2010) and the locals' love for it made it a place worth supporting. In July 2017, he performed a new one-man show for a week at Park Theatre (London), donating the proceeds to the theatre.

Together with a number of his Lord of the Rings co-stars (plus writer Philippa Boyens and director Peter Jackson), on 1 June 2020 McKellen joined Josh Gad's YouTube series Reunited Apart which reunites the cast of popular movies through video-conferencing, and promotes donations to non-profit charities.

Other work
A friend of Ian Charleson and an admirer of his work, McKellen contributed an entire chapter to For Ian Charleson: A Tribute. A recording of McKellen's voice is heard before performances at the Royal Festival Hall, reminding patrons to ensure their mobile phones and watch alarms are switched off and to keep coughing to a minimum. He also took part in the 2012 Summer Paralympics opening ceremony in London as Prospero from Shakespeare's The Tempest.

Acting credits

Accolades and honours 

McKellen has received two Academy Award nominations for his performances in Gods and Monsters (1999), and The Lord of the Rings: The Fellowship of the Ring (2001). He has also received 5 Primetime Emmy Award nominations. McKellen has received two Tony Award nominations winning for Best Actor in a Play for his performance in Amadeus in 1981. He has also received 12 Laurence Olivier Awards (Olivier Awards) nominations winning 6 awards for his performances in Pillars of the Community (1977), The Alchemist (1978), Bent (1979), Wild Honey (1984), Richard III (1991), and Ian McKellen on Stage: With Tolkien, Shakespeare, Others and YOU (2020).

He has also received various honorary awards including Pride International Film Festival's Lifetime Achievement & Distinction Award in 2004 and the Olivier Awards's Society Special Award in 2006. He also received Evening Standard Awards The Lebedev Special Award in 2009. The following year he received an Empire Award's Empire Icon Award In 2017 he received the Honorary Award from the Istanbul International Film Festival.

McKellen was knighted in 1991 for services to the performing arts, and made a Companion of Honour for services to drama and to equality in the 2008 New Year Honours.

See also 
List of British Academy Award nominees and winners
List of actors with Academy Award nominations
List of actors with two or more Academy Award nominations in acting categories
List of LGBTQ Academy Award winners and nominees

References

Sources

External links

 The papers of Sir Ian McKellen, actor are held by the Victoria and Albert Museum Theatre and Performance Department.
 
 
 
 Biography of Sir Ian McKellen, CH, CBE, Debrett's

1939 births
Living people
20th-century English male actors
21st-century English male actors
2012 Summer Olympics cultural ambassadors
Actors awarded knighthoods
Alumni of St Catharine's College, Cambridge
Annie Award winners
Audiobook narrators
Back Stage West Garland Award recipients
Best Supporting Actor Golden Globe (television) winners
Commanders of the Order of the British Empire
Critics' Circle Theatre Award winners
Drama Desk Award winners
Honorary Golden Bear recipients
English atheists
English male film actors
English male radio actors
English male Shakespearean actors
English male stage actors
English male television actors
English male video game actors
English male voice actors
English people of Scottish descent
English people of Ulster-Scottish descent
European Film Award for Best Actor winners
Fellows of St Catherine's College, Oxford
Former Protestants
English gay actors
Independent Spirit Award for Best Male Lead winners
Knights Bachelor
Laurence Olivier Award winners
English LGBT rights activists
Male actors from Lancashire
Members of the Order of the Companions of Honour
Outstanding Performance by a Cast in a Motion Picture Screen Actors Guild Award winners
Outstanding Performance by a Male Actor in a Supporting Role Screen Actors Guild Award winners
People educated at Bolton School
People from Burnley
People from Wigan
Actors from Bolton
Royal Shakespeare Company members
Tony Award winners
Shorty Award winners
20th-century English LGBT people
21st-century English LGBT people